Komoot is a mobile app for navigation and route planning.

History 
Komoot was founded in 2010 and is based in Germany. The app was launched in 2013.

Features 
The app has both free and paid-for features. It can create routes for various activities including walking, running, cycling, and mountain biking. It can report what percentage of a route consists of a given surface (roads, cycle tracks, gravel).

Technology 
The app uses OpenStreetMap.

References 

2010 establishments in Germany
Mobile route-planning software